The Carbosulcis Coal Mine is a coal mine located in Sardinia. The mine has coal reserves amounting to 2.5 billion tonnes of sub-bituminous coal, one of the largest coal reserves in Europe and the world. The mine closed its coal production activities in 2018, following a negotiation with the European Commission concerning state aid to the mine. Its annual production capacity in 2012 amounted in 1.5 million tonnes.

References 

Coal mines in Italy